Sisäinen solarium (Finnish for "the Inner Solarium" or "Solarium Within") is the second album of Ismo Alanko Säätiö, released in 2000. It is similar in style to their debut album, Pulu, with its folk influences and extensive use of Kimmo Pohjonen's accordion. It, as its predecessor, reached #1 on the Finnish album charts.

The album's tracks were originally composed for Labra show made for Culture Year 2000 with Stefan Lindfors. Lindfors handled the visual design while Alanko handled the musical side with Säätiö. Alanko told that he wanted to make music that was Finnish, but that sounded universal so that language wouldn't be a barrier while listening to it. He also wanted a choir for the project (this can be clearly heard on the album's opening track "Kirskainen Hyvätyinen").

According to Alanko the Labra was a long, heavy and demanding project that you normally shouldn't even think of doing. He was impressed that it was finished on time.

The thirteenth track "Minuutin hiljaisuus" consists of one minute of silence.

Track listing 
Music by Ismo Alanko Säätiö, except where noted. Lyrics by Alanko.
 "Kirskainen Hyvätyinen"—4:10
 "Sisäinen solarium"—5:23
 "Kosovo"—7:54
 "Tyhmää"—2:30
 "Media" (Alanko) -- 2:49
 "Datsun" (Alanko) -- 5:30
 "Paha silmä" (Alanko) -- 3:44
 "T" (Alanko) -- 2:56
 "Sana leijui" (Alanko) -- 5:13
 "Vallankumous"—4:10
 "e-mail.internet.seksi.seksi.seksi"—3:21
 "Ehkäpä elämä onkin vain sitä miltä tuntuu" (Alanko) -- 3:34
 "Minuutin hiljaisuus"—1:00
 "Sampo"—9:03

Personnel 
 Ismo Alanko -- vocals, cello
 Kimmo Pohjonen -- accordion, harmonica, kalimba, harmonium, vocals
 Teho Majamäki -- vibraphone, marimba, percussion
 Samuli Laiho -- guitar, strings, vocals
 Jussi Kinnunen -- bass, vocals
 Marko Timonen -- drums, percussion
 Anna-Mari Kähärä -- backing vocals
 Mia Simanainen—backing vocals
 Ona Kamu—backing vocals
 Riikka Väyrynen—backing vocals
 Säde Rissanen—backing vocals

Notes 

2000 albums
Ismo Alanko Säätiö albums